Ivanjski Vrh is a small settlement in the Municipality of Cerkvenjak in northeastern Slovenia. It lies in the Slovene Hills north of Cerkvenjak, just off the road towards Spodnji Ivanjci. The area is part of the traditional region of Styria and is now included in the Drava Statistical Region.

References

External links
Ivanjski Vrh on Geopedia

Populated places in the Municipality of Cerkvenjak